An area of tropical monsoon climate (occasionally known as a sub-equatorial, tropical wet climate or a tropical monsoon and trade-wind littoral climate) is a tropical climate sub-type that corresponds to the Köppen climate classification category Am. Tropical monsoon climates have monthly mean temperatures above  in every month of the year and a dry season. The tropical monsoon climate is the intermediate climate between the wet Af (or tropical rainforest climate) and the drier Aw (or tropical savanna climate).

In essence, a tropical monsoon climate tends to either have more rainfall than a tropical savanna climate or have less pronounced dry seasons. A tropical monsoon climate tends to vary less in temperature during a year than does a tropical savanna climate. This climate has a driest month which nearly always occurs at or soon after the winter solstice.

Versions
There are generally two versions of a tropical monsoon climate:
 Less pronounced dry seasons. Regions with this variation of the tropical monsoon climate typically see copious amounts of rain during the wet season(s), usually in the form of frequent thunderstorms. Unlike most tropical savanna climates, a sizeable amount of precipitation also falls during the dry season(s). In essence, this version of the tropical monsoon climate generally has less pronounced dry seasons than tropical savanna climates.
 Extraordinarily rainy wet seasons and pronounced dry seasons. This variation features pronounced dry seasons similar in length and character to dry seasons observed in tropical savanna climates. This is followed by a sustained period (or sustained periods) of extraordinary rainfall. In some instances, up to (and sometimes in excess of) 1,000 mm of precipitation is observed per month for two or more consecutive months. Tropical savanna climates generally do not see this level of sustained rainfall.

Area

Tropical monsoon are most commonly found in Africa (West and Central Africa), Asia (South and Southeast Asia), central of South America and Central America. This climate also occurs in sections of the Caribbean, North America, and northern Australia.

Factors
The major controlling factor over a tropical monsoon climate is its relationship to the monsoon circulation. The monsoon is a seasonal change in wind direction. In Asia, during the summer (or high-sun season) there is an onshore flow of air (air moving from ocean toward land). In the “winter” (or low-sun season) an offshore air flow (air moving from land toward water) is prevalent. The change in direction is due to the difference in the way water and land heat.

Changing pressure patterns that affect the seasonality of precipitation also occur in Africa though it generally differs from the way it operates in Asia. During the high-sun season, the Intertropical convergence zone (ITCZ) induces rain. During the low-sun season, the subtropical high creates dry conditions. The monsoon climates of Africa, and the Americas for that matter, are typically located along tradewind coasts.

Countries and cities
<div float="left">

Asia
 Alor Setar, Kedah, Malaysia
 Batticaloa, Sri Lanka
 Calamba, Philippines
 Cà Mau, Vietnam
 Chittagong, Bangladesh
 Da Nang, Vietnam
 Hat Yai, Thailand
 Jakarta, Indonesia
 Kochi, Kerala, India
 Malé, Maldives
 Mangalore, Karnataka, India
 Manila, Philippines
 Narathiwat, Thailand
 Pattani, Thailand
 Quezon City, Philippines
 Semarang, Indonesia
 Sihanoukville, Cambodia
 Sylhet, Bangladesh
 Taitung, Taiwan
 Thiruvananthapuram, Kerala, India
 Yangon, Myanmar
 Yogyakarta, Indonesia

Oceania
 Cairns, Queensland, Australia
 Port Moresby, Papua New Guinea
Africa
 Bata, Equatorial Guinea
 Conakry, Guinea
 Douala, Cameroon
 Freetown, Sierra Leone
 Monrovia, Liberia
 Port Harcourt, Nigeria
The Americas
 Macapá, Amapá, Brazil
 Barrancabermeja, Colombia
 Miami, Florida, United States
 Port of Spain, Trinidad and Tobago
 San Juan, Puerto Rico, United States
 Santo Domingo, Dominican Republic
 Villahermosa, Mexico
 Villavicencio, Colombia

Select charts

See also
 Tropical climate
 Tropical rainforest climate
 Tropical savanna climate
 Köppen climate classification

References

Climate, Monsoon
Köppen climate types